NJ2 may refer to:
 Compound NJ2, a xanthylium yellowish pigment found in wine
 China Railways NJ2, a class of diesel-electric locomotives employed by China Railways
 New Jersey's 2nd congressional district